Steinkjer may refer to:

Places
Steinkjer, a municipality in Trøndelag county, Norway
Steinkjer (town), a town in the municipality of Steinkjer in Trøndelag county, Norway
Steinkjer Church, a church in the municipality of Steinkjer in Trøndelag county, Norway
Steinkjer Station, a railway station in the municipality of Steinkjer in Trøndelag county, Norway

Other
Steinkjer FK, a football club in the town of Steinkjer, Norway
Steinkjer SK, a skiing club in the town of Steinkjer, Norway
Steinkjer TF, a gymnastics club in the town of Steinkjer, Norway
Steinkjer-Avisa, a newspaper in the town of Steinkjer, Norway